Return to Zero may refer to:

 Return-to-zero, a basic line code used in telecommunication
 Return to Zero (RTZ album), 1991
 Return to Zero (Spiritual Beggars album), 2010
 RTZ (band) (Return to Zero), an American rock band
 Return to Zero (film), a 2014 film